Bell Hooks (often stylized as bell hooks) is the second mixtape by American hip hop group BBU. It was released on Mishka and Mad Decent on February 21, 2012. Mixed by DJ Benzi, it features guest appearances from GLC, Mic Terror, and Das Racist. Its title derives from the pen name of feminist writer Gloria Jean Watkins. Music videos were created for "The Hood" and "Outlaw Culture", the former of which was included on Stereogums "5 Best Videos of the Week" list.

Critical reception

Marc Hogan of Pitchfork gave the mixtape a 7.8 out of 10, praising "the way the righteous fury fuels the celebration, the truth becomes the beauty, with barely a whiff of curmudgeonly condescension." John M. Tryneski of PopMatters gave the mixtape 8 stars out of 10, calling it "one of the most arresting musical and political statements of 2012".

PopMatters placed it at number 54 on the "75 Best Albums of 2012" list. Greg Kot of Chicago Tribune placed it at number 1 on the "Top Chicago Indie Albums" list. Leor Galil of Forbes placed it at number 12 on the "Best Free Albums of 2012" list.

Track listing

References

External links
 
 

2012 mixtape albums
Hip hop albums by American artists
Mad Decent albums